Wolica  is a village in the administrative district of Gmina Abramów, within Lubartów County, Lublin Voivodeship, in eastern Poland.

In 2005 the village had a population of 610.

References
 Lubartów County statistics

Villages in Lubartów County